Samuel Locke (1836 – 13 April 1890) was a 19th-century Member of Parliament from the Gisborne Region of New Zealand.

Locke was born in West Norfolk, England in 1836. He moved to Auckland, New Zealand in 1853 and took up work surveying. During the course of his work he became proficient in te reo Māori, being described by an Auckland newspaper as "essentially a Māori man". In the 1884 general election, he  defeated William Lee Rees. He retired in 1887 due to poor health. He was found dead in his bed on 13 April 1890, and was deemed to have died of apoplexy.

References

1836 births
1890 deaths
Members of the New Zealand House of Representatives
New Zealand MPs for North Island electorates
19th-century New Zealand politicians
People from King's Lynn and West Norfolk (district)
English emigrants to New Zealand
Unsuccessful candidates in the 1881 New Zealand general election